Byron Philip Jones (born September 26, 1992) is an American football cornerback who is currently a free agent. He played college football at UConn, and was drafted by the Dallas Cowboys in the first round of the 2015 NFL Draft after a stellar combine performance. He holds the unofficial world record for the standing long jump at 12 feet 3 inches (3.73 meters). He played five seasons for the Cowboys, where he was once named Second-team All-Pro and made the Pro Bowl. A free agent after his fifth season, Jones signed a five-year, $82 million contract with the Miami Dolphins, making him at the time the highest-paid cornerback in the NFL.

Early life
Jones attended St. Paul Catholic High School in Bristol, Connecticut and played for Jude Kelly.  He was a gifted track & field athlete, and was one of the state's top performers in the 200m and 400m. At the 2010 NVL Outdoor T&F Championships, he earned first-place finishes in both the 200-meter dash (22.13s) and 400-meter dash (48.43s).

In football, he received Class MM All-State and All-Naugatuck Valley honors as a senior and team captain. He was considered a two-star recruit by Rivals.com. He also played basketball. At the 2015 NFL scouting combine he set the world record for the longest broad jump at 12 ft 3 in.

College career
Jones accepted a scholarship from the University of Connecticut Huskies. As a redshirt freshman, he started 2 games at cornerback and six of the final seven games at safety. He recorded 51 tackles (sixth on the team), one fumble recovery, 2 interceptions and 4 passes defensed. He returned a fumble for a game-winning touchdown against the University of South Florida.

As a sophomore, he started 12 games at safety, tallying 88 tackles (third on the team), one interception and 2 passes defensed. The next year, he was switched to cornerback, starting 11-of-12 games, while registering 60 tackles (fourth on the team), 3 interceptions and 8 passes defensed.

Jones started 7 games at cornerback as a senior, posting 24 tackles, 2 interceptions and 4 passes defensed. He had a 70-yard interception return against the University of South Florida in what ESPN announcers called "what might be the UConn play of the year". He missed the rest of the season after undergoing surgery for a shoulder injury suffered in a loss against East Carolina University. He finished his college career with 223 total tackles, 8 interceptions and 2 touchdowns.

Professional career
Prior to the NFL combine, Jones was ranked the 25th best cornerback prospect in the draft by NFL.com. He was one of 54 defensive backs to receive an invitation to the NFL combine. At the NFL Scouting Combine, he set a new combine and world record for standing broad-jump by leaping 12 feet, 3 inches (3.73m), surpassing Jamie Collins's old record of 11 feet, 7 inches (3.53m) set in 2013. He was limited to the bench press, vertical jump, broad jump, short shuttle, and three-cone. Jones also finished first of all combine participants in the vertical leap. His combine performance gave him an immediate rise up draft boards and made him a top defensive back prospect.

On March 31, 2015, Jones attended UConn's pro day, along with Deshon Foxx, Geremy Davis, B. J. McBryde, and five others. He completed his combine drills and ran positional drills run by Minnesota Vikings' head coach Mike Zimmer. Zimmer was one of the team representatives and scouts from 29 NFL teams who attended his pro day, along with Philadelphia Eagles' head coach Chip Kelly. Jones had private workouts and visits with the Buffalo Bills, Philadelphia Eagles, Chicago Bears, and San Francisco 49ers. At the conclusion of the pre-draft process, Jones was projected to be a first round pick by NFL draft experts and scouts. He was ranked as the third best cornerback prospect in the draft by NFLDraftScout.com, was ranked the seventh best cornerback by NFL analyst Mike Mayock, and was ranked the seventh best cornerback in the draft by Sports Illustrated.

Dallas Cowboys
The Dallas Cowboys selected Jones in the first round (27th overall) of the 2015 NFL Draft. He was the fourth cornerback selected in 2015.

2015
On June 11, 2015, the Dallas Cowboys signed Jones to a four-year, $8.60 million contract that included $6.93 million guaranteed and a signing bonus of $6.51 million.

Throughout training camp, Jones competed for a job as a starting cornerback, against Morris Claiborne and Tyler Patmon, after Orlando Scandrick tore his MCL and ACL. Head coach Jason Garrett named Jones the backup cornerback behind Brandon Carr and Morris Claiborne.

He made his professional regular season debut in the Dallas Cowboys' season-opener against the New York Giants and made his first career tackle on Eli Manning during their 27-26 victory. On October 25, 2015, Jones recorded a season-high seven combined tackles and two pass deflections in the Cowboys' 27-20 loss at the New York Giants. On November 1, 2015, Jones earned his first career start at free safety in place of J. J. Wilcox. He made three combined tackles and a pass deflection in their 13-12 loss to the Seattle Seahawks. In Week 11, Jones earned his first start at cornerback after Morris Claiborne sustained a hamstring injury and missed two consecutive games (Weeks 11-13). He finished the Cowboys' 24-14 victory at the Miami Dolphins with three solo tackles and had difficulties in pass coverage after giving a 47-yard touchdown reception to Jarvis Landry and a 29-yard touchdown reception to Kenny Stills. He finished his rookie season with 67 combined tackles (47 solo) and nine pass deflections in 16 games and 11 starts. Jones started the final ten games of the season, with three starts at safety and four at cornerback and nickelback.

2016
Jones entered training camp as the favorite to start at free safety and competed with J.J. Wilcox. Defensive coordinator Rod Marinelli opted to name him as the starting free safety to start the regular season, alongside strong safety Barry Church.

In Week 10, Jones recorded a season-high 12 combined tackles (11 solo) during a 35-30 victory at the Pittsburgh Steelers. On December 18, 2016, he made seven combined tackles, broke up two passes, and recorded his first career interception off a pass by quarterback Jameis Winston in the Cowboys' 26-20 win against the Tampa Bay Buccaneers. Jones finished the  season with 88 combined tackles (73 solo), ten pass deflections, and an interception in 16 games and 16 starts. Pro Football Focus gave Jones an overall grade of 83.4 in 2016.

The Dallas Cowboys finished first in the NFC East with a 13-3 record and a first round bye. On January 15, 2017, Jones started his first career playoff game and recorded five solo tackles and deflected two passes in a 34-31 loss at the Green Bay Packers in the NFC Divisional round.

2017

Jones remained the starting free safety to begin the 2017 regular season, alongside strong safety Jeff Heath. In Week 4, he recorded a season-high seven solo tackles in the Cowboys' 35-30 loss against the Los Angeles Rams. On October 29, 2017, he made five combined tackles, broke up a pass, and returned an interception by Kirk Cousins for a 21-yard touchdown in a 33-19 victory at the Washington Redskins. On December 10, 2017, Jones collected a season-high nine combined tackles during a 30-10 win at the New York Giants. He finished the  season with 82 combined tackles (57 solo), five pass deflections, an interception, and a touchdown in 16 games and 16 starts. Pro Football Focus gave Jones an overall grade of 76.8 in 2017, which ranked 54th among all qualifying safeties.

2018
In the 2018 offseason, Jones announced that he would be switching from free safety back to cornerback. On April 22, 2018, the Cowboys picked up the fifth-year option on Jones' contract. After an excellent year as the Cowboys starting cornerback, Jones was elected to his first career Pro Bowl.

2019
In 2019, he was listed among the 40 Under 40 List put out by Connecticut Magazine.

Miami Dolphins
On March 21, 2020, Jones signed a five-year, $82 million contract with the Miami Dolphins, making him at the time the highest-paid cornerback in the NFL.

In Week 14 against the Kansas City Chiefs, Jones forced a fumble on Mecole Hardman that was recovered by the Dolphins and intercepted a pass thrown by Patrick Mahomes during the 33–27 loss.  This was Jones' first interception since the 2017 season.
In Week 17 against the Buffalo Bills, Jones recorded his career high second interception of the season off a pass thrown by Josh Allen during the 56–26 loss.  

Jones was placed on the reserve/PUP list to start the 2022 season, but was ultimately not activated during the season.

On March 15, 2023, the Dolphins released Jones.

NFL career statistics

Regular season

References

External links
 Connecticut Huskies bio
 Dallas Cowboys bio
 Official video of the standing long jump

Living people
1992 births
Sportspeople from New Britain, Connecticut
Players of American football from Connecticut
American football cornerbacks
UConn Huskies football players
Dallas Cowboys players
Miami Dolphins players
National Conference Pro Bowl players